Marcus Licinius Crassus was a member of the First Triumvirate with Julius Caesar and Pompey the Great.

Marcus Licinius Crassus may also refer to:

 Marcus Licinius Crassus (quaestor 54 BC), son of the above
 Marcus Licinius Crassus (consul 30 BC), son of the above, who led a successful campaign in Macedonia and Thrace from 29 to 27 BC
 Marcus Licinius Crassus Frugi (consul 14 BC), born into the Calpurnius Piso Frugi family, adopted by the above
 Marcus Licinius Crassus Frugi (consul 27), son of the above